Birmingham Rowing Club is an amateur rowing club, based at Birmingham in England. It is situated on Edgbaston Reservoir in the centre of Birmingham. The club was founded in 1873 although there is reference to a 'Birmingham Soho Club' using the reservoir earlier in 1859.

The club, which serves Birmingham is  an open rowing club for men, women, adults, juniors and veterans. It is  affiliated to British Rowing. The club's president is Peter Veitch who was elected at the AGM in 2015 after the death of Sir Adrian Cadbury.

Henley Successes
The club's earliest win at Henley Royal Regatta was the Wyfold Challenge Cup in 1904. A dearth of further successes was ended with appearance in the finals of the Doubles in the 1950s by Ken Tinegate and Graham Beech, and then wins in the early 1960s by George Justicz.

Honours

Henley Royal Regatta

British champions

References

External links
 Birmingham Rowing Club official website
Price Waterhouse clears the way for Birmingham Rowing Club

Sports clubs established in 1873
Rowing clubs in England
1873 establishments in England
Sport in Birmingham, West Midlands